Coleophora consumpta is a moth of the family Coleophoridae. It is found east of the Nullarbor Plain in Australia.

References

Moths of Australia
consumpta
Moths described in 1996